Kacer, Kačer or Káčer may refer to:
Kačer, village in Serbia

People with the surname 
Jan Kačer (born 1936), Czech actor and film producer
Kathy Kacer (born 1954), Canadian writer
Miroslav Káčer (born 1996), Slovak footballer
Rastislav Káčer (born 1965), Slovak diplomat, Minister of Foreign Affairs (2022-)

See also
 

Czech-language surnames
Slovak-language surnames